Ronda Jo Miller (born 21 April 1978) is a retired American professional deaf female basketball and volleyball player. She is one of the few deaf women basketball players to have tried out for WNBA. Miller is the first deaf woman to make an attempt to play in the WNBA league in 2005. However, she did not make the team.

Biography 
Ronda Jo Miller was born profoundly deaf in Little Falls, Minnesota. As a child she played basketball with her brother, Robert using a hoop nailed to a shed next to their barn. She attended the Minnesota State Academy for the Deaf and at the Metro Deaf School. She graduated at Gallaudet University in 2001.

Career 
She made her Deaflympic debut at the 1997 Summer Deaflympics as part of the US deaf basketball team that claimed the gold medal. She then became the member of the US deaf volleyball team and clinched silver and bronze medals at the 2001 Summer Deaflympics and 2005 Summer Deaflympics respectively.

Apart from her Deaflympic career, she had a historic stint with Gallaudet University women's basketball team, scoring over 1000 points for Bison.

In 1997, she was nominated for the ICSD Deaf Sportswoman of the Year award for her performance in the basketball event at the 1997 Summer Deaflympics. She was inducted into the Gallaudet Athletics Hall of Fame in 2008. She retired from international basketball competitions in 2014.

References 

1978 births
Living people
American women's basketball players
American women's volleyball players
Deaf basketball players
American deaf people
Gallaudet University alumni
People from Little Falls, Minnesota
Deaf volleyball players
21st-century American women